Tennebø is a village in Kinn Municipality in Vestland county, Norway. The lake Degnepollvatnet is just north of the village of Tennebø. The village sits along the Skavøypollen, a small bay off the main Nordfjorden.

The population in 1999 was 481, but since 2001 it has been considered a part of the urban area of Måløy, so specific population figures are not available.

Notable residents
Bjørg Sandal (born 1955) is a politician from the Norwegian Labour Party and is from Tennebø.

References

Villages in Vestland
Kinn